Methods of divination can be found around the world, and many cultures practice the same methods under different names. Names like drimimantia, nigromantia, and horoscopia arose, along with other pseudosciences such as phrenology and physiognomy.

Some forms of divination are much older than the Middle Ages, like haruspication, while others (such as megapolisomancy or coffee-based tasseomancy) originated in the 20th and 21st centuries.

The chapter "How Panurge consulteth with Herr Trippa" of Gargantua and Pantagruel, a parody on occult treatises of Heinrich Cornelius Agrippa, contains a list of over two dozen "mancies", described as "common knowledge".

A

 abacomancy  (also amathomancy): by dust (Hebrew , dust + Greek , prophecy)
 acutomancy  → see  (Latin  [], needle + Greek , prophecy)
 adromancy  → see  (from idromancy below, influenced by alomancy)
 adryomancy→ see  (metathesis of hydromancy)
 aeromancy : by atmospheric conditions (Greek , air + , prophecy)
 agalmatomancy : by statues (Greek  [], statue + , prophecy)
 aichmomancy : by sharp objects (Greek , spearhead + , prophecy)
 ailuromancy/aeluromancy → see 
 alectormancy/alectromancy : by rooster sacrifice (Greek , rooster + , prophecy)
 alectryomancy/alectoromancy: by rooster divination → see 
 aleuromancy¹ : by flour; see also  (Greek , meal + , prophecy)
 alomancy/Halomancy  (also adromancy): by salt (Greek , salt + , prophecy)
 alphitomancy: by barley (Greek  [], barley + , prophecy)
 alveromancy : by sounds
 amathomancy  → see  by sand (Greek , sandy soil + , prophecy)
 ambulomancy : by walking (Latin , to walk + Greek , prophecy)
 amniomancy : by placenta (Greek , amnion + , prophecy)
 anemoscopy/anemomancy : by wind (Greek , wind + , observation)
 anthomancy : by flowers (Greek , flower + , prophecy)
 anthracomancy : by burning coals (Greek  [], charcoal + , prophecy)
 anthropomancy : by human sacrifice (Greek , human being + , prophecy)
 anthroposcopy : by physical appearance (Greek , human being + , observation)
 apantomancy : by chance encounters with animals (Greek , to encounter + , prophecy)
 arachnomancy : by spiders (Greek , spider + , prophecy)
 archeomancy/archaeomancy : by sacred relics (Greek , ancient + , prophecy)
 arithmancy: assigning numerical value to a word or phrase
 armomancy : by one's own shoulders (Latin , shoulder + Greek , prophecy)
 aruspicina: study of entrails
 aspidomancy : by sitting in a drawn circle or on a shield (Greek  [{{transl|grc|aspid-], shield + , prophecy)
 astragalomancy/astragalamancy → see 
 astragyromancy → see  (from astragalomancy above, perhaps influenced by Greek , spiral, circle, and therefore vertebra)
 astrapomancy : by lightning (Greek , lightning flash + , prophecy)
 astrology/astromancy/ : by celestial bodies (Greek , star + , study). This method was widespread in medieval period, particularly in Mesopotamia. 
 augury  → see 
 auramancy : by auras (Greek , breath + , prophecy)
 auspicy/auspication → see  (Latin , bird + , to look at)
 austromancy → see  : by wind (Latin , south wind + Greek , prophecy)
 avimancy → see  (Latin , bird + Greek , prophecy)
 axiomancy/axinomancy : by axes (Latin , axis + , prophecy)

B
 batraquomancy/batrachomancy : by frogs (Greek , frog + , prophecy)
 bibliomancy → see 
 biorhythmic divination: by biorhythms
 bletonism/bletonomancy : by water current (named for Monsieur Bleton, a French bletonist)
 bolomancy  → see  (Greek , arrow + , prophecy)
 bone-throwing the tossing of pieces of bone or wood practiced by various cultures
 botanomancy : by burning sage or figs (Greek , flora + , prophecy)
 brizomancy → see  (Greek , to be sleepy + , prophecy)
 brontomancy/brontoscopy : by thunder (Greek , thunder + , prophecy)
 bumpology : by bumps on the skin (English bump + Greek , study)

C
 cabala → see 
 canomancy  or : by dogs (Latin , dog + Greek , prophecy)
 capnomancy : by smoke (Greek , smoke + , prophecy)
 libanomancy : by smoke or ash from incense (Greek , frankincense + , prophecy)
 carromancy : by melting wax (Greek , of wax + , prophecy)
 cartopedy → see  (Latin , papyrus paper +  [], foot)
 cartomancy → see 
 catoptromancy/captromancy → see 
 causimancy/causimomancy : by burning (Greek  [], to burn + , prophecy)
 cephalomancy → see 
 cephaleonomancy/cephalonomancy: by boiling a donkey's head (Greek , head [with meaning influenced by Greek , donkey] + , prophecy)
 ceraunoscopy : by thunder and lightning (Greek , thunderbolt + , observation)
 ceromancy/ceroscopy : by dripping wax in water (Greek , wax + , prophecy)
 chalcomancy: by striking gongs or copper bowls (Greek , copper + , prophecy)
 chaomancy : by aerial visions (Greek , primordial space + , prophecy)
 chartomancy : by things on paper (Greek , papyrus paper + , prophecy)
 cartomancy : by cards (Latin , papyrus paper + Greek , prophecy)
 taromancy/tarotmancy : by tarot (English tarot + Greek , prophecy)
 Parrot astrology: by parrots picking cards
 stichomancy : by books or lines (Greek , line of verse + , prophecy)
 aleuromancy² : by fortune cookies (of the same origin as ¹)
 bibliomancy : by the Bible (Greek , book + , prophecy)
 I Ching divination: by the I Ching or the accompanying I Ching manual
 stoicheomancy/stoichomancy: by the Iliad and the Odyssey or the Aeneid (Greek , element + , prophecy; to the Greeks, Homer's writings were held in similar esteem to the Christian Bible or the Muslim Quran, as were Virgil's writings to the Romans, making them the basic — or elementary — reading material in each culture)
 cheiromancy/chiromancy→ see 
 cheirognomy/chirognomy → see 
  → see 
 choriomancy : by pig bladders (Greek , placenta + mantiea, prophecy)
 chresmomancy : by the ravings of lunatics (Greek , oracular utterance, chresm + , prophecy)
 chronomancy : by apt occasion (Greek , time + , prophecy)
 cineromancy/ceneromancy → see   (Latin  [], ashes + Greek , prophecy)
 clamancy (see also Fāl-gūsh): by random shouts and cries heard in crowds, at night, etc. (Latin , to cry out + Greek , prophecy)
 cledonism/cledonomancy : by chance events or overheard words (Greek , rumor)
 cleidomancy/clidomancy : by keys (Greek  [], key + , prophecy)
 cleromancy : by casting (Greek , lot + , prophecy)
 astragalomancy/astragalamancy  (also cubomancy): by dice (Greek , vertebra + , prophecy)
 domino divination: by dominoes
 favomancy : by beans (Latin , bean + Greek , prophecy)
 Ogham casting: by Ogham letters
 runecasting/runic divination
 cometomancy : by comet tails (Greek , comet + , prophecy)
 colormancy/coloromancy: by colors (English color + Greek , prophecy)
 conchomancy : by shells (Greek , mussel + , prophecy)
 cosquinomancy/coscinomancy : by hanging sieves (Greek , sieve + , prophecy)
 cottabomancy/cottobomancy : by wine in a brass bowl (Greek , cottabus + , prophecy)
 craniognomy  or  → see  (Greek , skull + , interpretation)
 the crawling baby: by a baby's crawling
 crithomancy/critomancy : by barley cakes (Greek , barley + , prophecy)
 cromnyomancy/cromniomancy : by onion sprouts (alteration of Greek , onion + , prophecy)
 cryptomancy : by omens (Greek , hidden + , prophecy)
 cryomancy : by ice (Greek , ice )
 crystal ball gazing → see 
 crystal gazing → see 
 crystallomancy  → see  (Greek , crystal + , prophecy)
 cubomancy  → see  (Greek , cube + , prophecy)
 cyathomancy : by cups (Greek , cup + , prophecy)
 cybermancy : by computer oracles (English  + Greek , prophecy)
 cyclicomancy : by swirling water in a cup (Greek , cyclical, circular + , prophecy)
 cyclomancy  or : by wheels (Greek , circle + , prophecy)

D
 dactyliomancy : by finger rings (Greek , finger ring + , prophecy)
 dactylomancy : by means of finger movements (Greek , finger + , prophecy)
 daphnomancy : by burning laurel wreaths (Greek , laurel + , prophecy)
 demonomancy : by demons (Greek , divine power + , prophecy)
 dendromancy : by trees, especially oaks, yews, or mistletoe (Greek , tree + , prophecy)
 deuteroscopy : by second glance or double take (Greek , secondary + , observation)
 dianomancy : by delivery, esp. by the randomly-generated words found on Whole Foods grocery bags to identify orders (Greek , delivery + , prophecy)
 dictiomancy : by randomly opening a dictionary (English  + Greek , prophecy)
 divining → see 
 djubed→ see 
 : by animal horoscope (Japanese , animal + , prognostication)
 domino divination → see 
 dowsing (also divining, water witching): by a divining rod (of unknown origin)
 dracomancy : by dragons (Greek , dragon + , prophecy)
 dream questions: by dreaming
 dririmancy/driromancy : by dripping blood (alteration of drimimancy, influenced by Middle English , blood)
 drimimancy/drymimancy : by bodily fluids (Greek , pungent + , prophecy)

E
 electromancy: by lightning and electricity (Greek  electric +  prophecy)
 eleomancy/elaeomancy: by oil (Greek , olive oil + , prophecy)
 emonomancy → see 
 empirimancy: by experiment/experience
 empyromancy : by burning (Greek , fiery + , prophecy)
 encromancy: by oil ink stains (Greek  oil ink +  prophecy)
 enochian chess: by playing a four·handed variant of the game
 enoptromancy  → see  (Greek , looking glass + , prophecy)
 enthusiasm: speeches by those supposed to be possessed by a divine spirit
 entomomancy/entomancy: by insects (Greek , insect + , prophecy)
 eromancy : by water vessels exposed to air (Greek , air + , prophecy) — cf. aeromancy
 extispicy/extispication : by the remains of sacrificed animals (Latin , entrails + , to look at)

F
 favomancy → see 
 felidomancy → see  (Latin  [], cat + Greek , prophecy)
 feng shui → see 
 floriography/floromancy : by flowers' feelings (Latin  [flōr-], flower + Greek , representation)
 fractomancy : by fractals (English  + Greek , prophecy)
 fructomancy/fructimancy: by fruit (Latin , fruit + Greek , prophecy)

G
 galvanoscopy : by galvanism (English  + Greek , observation)
 gastromancy¹ → see 
 gastromancy² : by guttural sounds (Greek , belly + , prophecy)
 geomancy : by earth (Greek |, earth + , prophecy)
 feng Shui divination: by Feng Shui
 geloscopy : by laughter (Greek , laughter + , observation)
 gematria: by the Hebrew alphabet (Greek , earth + , measurement)
 genethlialogy: by birth dates (Greek , birthday + , study)
 grammomancy : by writing individual letters (Greek , letter + , prophecy)
 graphology  (also graptomancy): by studying handwriting (Greek , writing + , study)
 graptomancy  → see  (Greek , written + , prophecy)
 gyromancy : by dizziness (Greek , spiral + , prophecy)

H
 hagiomancy: by saints (Greek , holy + , prophecy)
 halomancy  → see 
 : by bones or dice
 haruspicy/haruspication  → see  (Latin , entrails + , to look at)
 hematomancy/haematomancy : by blood (Greek  [], blood + , prophecy)
 hepatoscopy/hepatomancy  (also haruspicy, haruspication): by liver (Greek  [], liver + , observation)
 hieromancy/hieroscopy : by studying sacrifices' entrails (Greek , holy + , prophecy)
 hippomancy → see 
 horoscopy : aspect of the Stars at nativity (Greek , season + , observation)
 hydatomancy: by rainwater (Greek , raindrop + , prophecy)
 hydromancy/hydroscopy → see 
 hyomancy: by wild hogs (Greek , swine + , prophecy)
 hypnomancy : by sleep (Greek , sleep + , prophecy)

I
 I Ching divination → see 
 ichnomancy : by footprints (Greek , track + , prophecy)
 ichthyomancy → see 
 iconomancy : by icons (Greek , image + , prophecy)
 idolomancy : by idols (Greek , phantom + , prophecy)
 idromancy → see  (Greek , sweat + , prophecy)
 : geomancy patterns generated with palm nuts, opele, cowrie shells, etc... that refer to  divination texts; a collection of  verses
 iridology: by eye color (Greek  [], iris + , study)
 isopsephy: by numbers and letters (Greek , equal + , pebble)

J
  Vedic system of astrology

K
 kabbalah/qabalah/cabala: by the Kabbalah (Hebrew , tradition)
 : by bamboo
 : by rice gruel
 kephalonomancy  → see 
 keraunomancy  → see 
 knissomancy : by incense (Greek  [kniss-], vapor + , prophecy)
 kypomancy → see  (akin to Greek , goblet + , prophecy)

L
 labiomancy : by lips (Latin , lip + Greek , prophecy)
 lampadomancy : by flame (Greek  [], light + , prophecy)
 lecanomancy/lecanoscopy : by a basin of water (Greek , basin + , prophecy)
 letnomancy: by secrets (English let no (man see) + Greek , prophecy)
 literomancy : by a letter in a written language (Latin , letter + Greek , prophecy)
 lithomancy : by gems or stones (Greek , stone + , prophecy)
 logarithmancy : by logarithms (English logarithm + Greek , prophecy)
 logomancy : by words (Greek , word + , prophecy)
 lots: divination through chance, or the drawing or tossing of lots
 lunamancy → see  (Latin , moon + Greek , prophecy)
 lychnomancy : by candles (Greek , lamp + , prophecy)

M
 macharomancy: by swords or knives (Greek , dirk + , prophecy)
 macromancy : by large objects (Greek , large + , prophecy)
 maculomancy : by spots on the skin (Latin , spot + , prophecy)
 mahjong divination: by Mahjong tiles
 margaritomancy : by bouncing pearls (Greek , pearl + , prophecy)
 mathemancy : by mathematics (English  + Greek , prophecy)
 mazomancy : by nursing (Greek , breast + , prophecy)
 meconomancy : by sleeping (Greek , poppy [i.e., an opiate] + , prophecy)
 megapolisomancy: by large cities (English megalopolis + Greek , prophecy)
 meilomancy: by moles
 metagnomy  or : by magic (Greek , beside + , interpretation)
 meteormancy : by meteors (English meteor + Greek , prophecy)
 meteoromancy : by thunder and lightning (Greek , heavenly phenomenon + , prophecy)
 metoposcopy/metopomancy : by the lines of the forehead (Greek , forehead + , observation)
 micromancy : by small objects (Greek , small + , prophecy)
 moleosophy  or : by blemishes (English mole + Greek , knowledge)
 molybdomancy : by molten metal (Greek , lead + , prophecy)
 moromancy : by foolishness (Greek , dull + , prophecy)
 myomancy → see 
 myrmomancy → see

N
 narcomancy : by sleep (Greek , numbness + , prophecy)
 natimancy → see  (Latin , buttock + Greek , prophecy)
 necromancy¹ : by speaking to the dead, by corpses (Greek , corpse + , prophecy)
 necyomancy : by summoning damned souls (Greek , invocation + , prophecy)
 nephomancy : by clouds (Greek , cloud + , prophecy)
 nigromancy : by black magic (Latin , black + Greek , prophecy)
 nomancy  or  → see  (variant of onomancy, influenced by Latin , name)
 notarikon/netrikon: by initials (Latin , in shorthand)
 nggàm → see 
 numerology : by numbers (Latin , number + Greek , branch of study)
 numismatomancy: by coins (Greek  [], coin + , prophecy)

O
 oculomancy : by eyes (Latin , eye + Greek , prophecy)
 odontomancy : by teeth (Greek  [], tooth + , prophecy)
 oenomancy/oinomancy : by wine (Greek , wine + , prophecy)
 ololygmancy : by the howling of dogs (Greek  [], howl + , prophecy)
 omoplatoscopy → see  (Greek , shoulder blade + , observation)
 omphalomancy : by navels (Greek , navel + , prophecy)
 oneiromancy/oneiroscopy : by dreams (Greek , dream + , prophecy)
 onimancy  → see 
 onomancy/onomomancy/nomancy : by letters in a name (Greek , name + , prophecy)
 onomomancy  → see 
 onychomancy/onymancy/onimancy : by finger· and toenails (Greek  [], nail + , prophecy)
 onymancy  → see 
 oomancy/ooscopy  (also ovomancy): by eggs (Greek , egg + , prophecy)
 ophidiomancy/ophiomancy → see 
 ophthalmomancy → see  (Greek , eye + , prophecy)
 organoscopy → see  (Greek , organ + , observation)
 orniscopy/ornithomancy → see 
 oromancy: by mountains (Greek , mountain + , prophecy)
 oryctomancy: by minerals (Greek , dug + , prophecy)
 ossomancy → see  (Latin  [], bone + Greek , prophecy)
 osteomancy: by bones (Greek , bone + , prophecy)
 Ouija/Ouije: by ouija board (French , yes + German , yes)
 ouranomancy → see 
 ovomancy → see  (Latin , egg + Greek , prophecy)

P
 pallomancy: by pendulums (Greek , to sway + , prophecy)
 palmistry/palm reading → see  (Latin , palm)
 papyromancy: by folding paper, especially paper money (Greek , papyrus paper + , prophecy)
 pedomancy → see  (from podomancy, influenced by Latin  [], foot)
 pegomancy: by fountains (Greek , spring + , prophecy)
 pessomancy: by pebbles (Greek , oval pebble + , prophecy)
 phallomancy: by swing of the phallus (Greek , phallus + , prophecy)
 phobomancy: by feelings of fear (Greek , fear + , prophecy)
 photomancy: by fields of light (Greek  [phōt-], light + , prophecy)
 phrenology (also organoscopy): by the configuration of one's brain (Greek , mind + , study)
 phyllomancy: by leaves (Greek , leaf + , prophecy)
 sycomancy: by fig leaves (Greek , fig + , prophecy)
 tasseography/tasseomancy (also kypomancy): by tea leaves or coffee grounds (French , cup + Greek , representation)
 phyllorhodomancy: by rose petals (Greek , leaf + , rose + , prophecy)
 physiognomy/physiognomancy: by faces (Greek , nature + , interpretation)
 phytognomy: by the appearance of plants (Greek , plant + , interpretation)
 plastromancy: by cracks formed by heat on a turtle's plastron (English plastron + , prophecy)
 pilimancy: by observing the patterns produced by a collection of human hair
 plumbomancy: by observing shapes molten lead makes when poured in water (Latin , lead + Greek , prophecy)
 pneumancy: by blowing (Greek , breath + , prophecy)
 podomancy/pedomancy → see 
 poe divination: by throwing stones on the floor, practised at Taoist temples
  (also ): study of natural phenomena
 psephomancy: by lots or ballots (Greek , pebble + , prophecy)
 pseudomancy: by false means, such as Peter Answers (Greek , false + , prophecy)
 psychognomy: by phrenological notations (Greek , soul + , observation)
 psychomancy → see ¹ (Greek , soul + , prophecy)
 ptarmoscopy/ptarmoscopie: from ancient Greek the interpretation of sneezes
 pyromancy/pyroscopy: by fire (Greek , fire + , prophecy)

Q
  → see

R
 radiesthesia: by rods, pendulums, or other cylindrical tools (Latin , spoke + Greek , sensing)
 retromancy: by looking over one's shoulder (Latin , behind + Greek , prophecy)
 rhabdomancy/rabdomancy: by rods, sticks, or wands (Greek , rod + , prophecy)
 rhapsodomancy: by poetry (Greek , verse + , prophecy)
 roadomancy: by constellations (apparently from Old English , firmament + Greek , prophecy)
 rumpology → see 
 runecasting → see

S
 scapulimancy/scapulomancy (also spatulamancy, omoplatoscopy): by bovine or caprid shoulder blades (Latin , shoulder blade + Greek , prophecy)
 scarpomancy: by old shoes (Italian , shoe + Greek , prophecy)
 scatomancy: by excrement (Greek  [], excrement + , prophecy)
 schematomancy → see 
 sciomancy¹ (also shadowmancy): by shadows (Greek , shadow + , prophecy)
 sciomancy²: by spirits (of the same origin as sciomancy¹)
 scrying: by gazing (shortened from descrying)
 crystal gazing: by reflective objects
 catoptromancy/captromancy (also enoptromancy, djubed): by mirrors (Greek , mirror + , prophecy)
 gastromancy¹ (also crystallomancy, spheromancy, crystal ball gazing): by crystal ball (Greek , belly [i.e., round object] + , prophecy)
 hydromancy (also ydromancy): by water (Greek , water + , prophecy)
 selenomancy: by the moon (Greek , moon + , prophecy)
 shadowmancy → see ¹ (English shadow + Greek , prophecy)
 Shufflemancy: by the use of an electronic media player such as an electronic playlist, iPod, or other medium wherein one skips a certain number of songs and the lyrics and/or tune of the song is the answer to the divinatory question
 sideromancy: by burning straw with an iron (Greek , iron + , prophecy)
 : by drawing sixteen lines in sand (perhaps a Malagasy transliteration of English sixteen)
 skatharomancy: by beetle tracks (Greek , spot + , prophecy)
 /: by animal shoulder blades (Scottish Gaelic , shoulder blade)
 solaromancy: by the sun (Latin  [{{wikt-lang|la|sōlāris|sōlār-], sun + Greek , prophecy)
 somatomancy: by the human form (Greek  [], body + , prophecy)
 cephalomancy (also craniognomy): by skulls (Greek , head + , prophecy)
 cheiromancy/chiromancy  (also palmistry, palm reading): by palms (Greek , hand + , prophecy)
 cheirognomy/chirognomy : by hands (Greek , hand + , interpretation)
 podomancy/pedomancy (also cartopedy): by the soles of one's feet (Greek  [], foot + , prophecy)
 rumpology (also natimancy): by buttocks (English rump + Greek , study)
 schematomancy: by the face (Greek  [], figure + , prophecy)
 sortilege: by the casting of lots, or sortes
 sortes virgilianae: by Vergil's Aeneid
 spasmatomancy: by convulsions (alteration of spasmodomancy, from Greek  [], spasm + , prophecy)
 spatilomancy: by animal excrement (Greek , excrement + , prophecy)
 spatulamancy → see  (from scapulimancy, influenced by Latin , splint)
 spheromancy → see  (Greek , sphere + , prophecy)
 sphondulomancy: by spindles (Greek , spindle + , prophecy)
 splanchnomancy → see  (Greek , innards + , prophecy)
 spodomancy: by soot (Greek , wood ashes + , prophecy)
 cineromancy/ceneromancy: by the ashes of a specifically sacrificial or ritual fire
 libanomancy : by smoke or ash from incense (Greek , frankincense + , prophecy)
 tephramancy/tephromancy: by tree bark ashes, by sacrificial or ritual fire ashes, or human sacrificial victim ashes (Greek , ash + , prophecy)
 stareomancy: by the four elements (Greek  [], dough + , prophecy)
 stercomancy: by seeds in bird excrement (Latin , excrement + Greek , prophecy)
 sternomancy: by ridges on the breastbone (Greek , breastbone + , prophecy)
 stichomancy → see 
 stigonomancy: by burning writing onto bark (Greek  [], to brand + , prophecy)
 stoicheomancy/stoichomancy → see 
 stolisomancy: by fashion (Greek , garment + , prophecy)
 styramancy: by observing patterns produced by chewing gum, gum wax, or products produced by the L. styraciflua tree
 sycomancy → see 
 symbolomancy: by things found on the road (Greek , sign + , prophecy)

T
 taromancy → see 
 tasseography/tasseomancy → see 
 technomancy: by technology (English  + Greek , prophecy)
 temurah: → see 
 tephramancy/tephromancy: → see  (Greek , ash + , prophecy)
 theomancy: foretelling events, prophecy (Greek , god + , prophecy)
 theriomancy : (also zoomancy): by animal behavior (Greek , wild animal + , prophecy)
 ailuromancy/aeluromancy  (also felidomancy): by cats (Greek , cat + , prophecy)
 alectryomancy/alectoromancy : by rooster behavior (Greek , cockerel + , prophecy)
 augury: by bird formations (Latin , diviner)
 hippomancy : by horse behavior (Greek , horse + , prophecy)
 ichthyomancy : by fish behavior (Greek , fish + , prophecy)
 myomancy : by rodent behavior (Greek , mouse + , prophecy)
 myrmomancy : by ant behavior (Greek , ant + , prophecy)
 nggàm: by spider or crab behavior (Mambila , divination)
 ophidiomancy/ophiomancy: by snakes behavior (Greek  [], snake + , prophecy)
 orniscopy/ornithomancy (also auspicy/auspication, avimancy): by bird migration (Greek  [], bird + , observation)
 thumomancy : by one's own soul, presage (Greek , soul + , prophecy)
 topomancy : by geography and geological formations (Greek , place + , prophecy)
 transataumancy: by things accidentally seen or heard
 trochomancy : by wheel ruts (Greek , wheel + , prophecy)
 turifumy: by shapes in smoke (Latin  [], incense + , vapor)
 tyromancy/tiromancy : by cheese (Greek , cheese + , prophecy)

U
 umbilicomancy: by umbilical cords (English  + Greek , prophecy)
 umbromancy: by shade (Latin , shadow + Greek , prophecy)
 uranomancy/ouranomancy: by the sky (Greek , firmament + , prophecy)
 uromancy/urimancy: by urine (Greek , urine + , prophecy)
 urticariaomancy: by itches (New Latin , hives + Greek , prophecy)

V
 videomancy: by films (English video + Greek , prophecy)

W
 water witching → see 
 wishbone → see

X
 xenomancy: by strangers (Greek , stranger + , prophecy)
 xylomancy: by the shape or texture of wood, or the appearance of burning wood (Greek , wood + , prophecy)

Y
 ydromancy¹ → see 
 ydromancy² → see  (from idromancy above, influenced by alomancy)
 Yes No Oracle
 Answering Oracle: Full responses to more detailed questions

Z
 zoomancy → see  (Greek , being + , prophecy)
 zygomancy: by weights (Greek , yoke, balance + , prophecy)

See also
 Divination
 List of astrological traditions
 Wiktionary category:English words suffixed with -mancy

References